Emily Anne Hart is an American former actress. She is the younger sister of actress Melissa Joan Hart and is best known for her roles as Sabrina Spellman in Sabrina: The Animated Series and Amanda Wiccan in Sabrina the Teenage Witch.

Biography 
Hart is a daughter of television producer Paula Hart (née Voje) and William Hart, a businessman. She has six sisters (three of whom are half-sisters) and one brother. Her stepfather (since 1994) is television executive Leslie Gilliams, who competed on Season 5 of the American version of MasterChef in 2014, finishing in 3rd place. Her older siblings Melissa, Trisha, Elizabeth, and Brian Hart have all been in show business to varying degrees, as have younger half-sisters Alexandra Gilliams, Samantha Gilliams, and Mackenzie Hart.

Hart started acting influenced by her older sister Melissa. In 1994, she played Tommy, Age 4 in the Broadway production of The Who's Tommy. In 1998, she won a Young Artist Award for her role in the television movie The Right Connections. She was also nominated that year for a guest appearance on the series Sabrina, the Teenage Witch, in which her sister Melissa Joan Hart starred. A later episode of that series, entitled "Witchright Hall", served as a backdoor pilot for a possible spin-off series starring Hart as Sabrina's younger cousin Amanda, but the show was not picked up by The WB.

In 1999, Hart was cast in the title role of Sabrina: The Animated Series while her older sister Melissa co-starred as Hilda and Zelda Spellman, for which she was nominated for Young Artist Awards in 2000 and 2001, winning the second of the two. Also in 2001, Hart starred as the teen-aged Shirley Temple in the TV movie Child Star: The Story of Shirley Temple. In 2003, she won another Young Artist Award for a guest appearance on the series Sabrina, the Teenage Witch.

In 2005, Hart starred in a short film Mute, directed by her older sister Melissa. In 2008 she played York in the horror thriller film Nine Dead released in 2009/2010, which also featured her older sister Melissa. She was the narrator for the 2016 audio book of Things I Can't Explain: A Clarissa Novel.

Personal life 

In September 2013, Hart married Alex Madar. They have two sons.

Filmography

Film

Television

Stage

Awards and nominations

References

External links

Emily Hart on Instagram 
Emily Hart on Twitter

 
|-
! colspan="3" style="background: #DAA520;" | Young Artist Award
|-

|-

Living people
20th-century American actresses
21st-century American actresses
Actresses from New York (state)
American child actresses
American film actresses
American television actresses
American voice actresses
People from Sayville, New York
Year of birth missing (living people)